Atomenergomash (AEM) is a power engineering Russian company. Аtomenergomash JSC (AEM Holding company, AEM, Group) is a Russian power engineering company, a supplier of products for nuclear and thermal power plants, natural gas and petrochemical industry, shipbuilding, and special steel markets.
It is the nuclear power division of Rosatom. Together with its subsidiaries it employees more than 17,000 people.

History
AEM was established in 2006 as part of Rosatom State Atomic Energy Corporation.

Operations 
Atomenergomash is the largest power engineering holdings in Russia, that offers a full range of solutions in the areas of design, manufacture, and supply of equipment for nuclear and thermal energy, gas and petrochemical, shipbuilding industries, and the market of special steels.

Structure 
Atomenergomash incorporates the following companies:
 TSNIITMASH
 OKB Gidropress
 OKBM Afrikantov
 AEM-Technologies
 CKMB
 Energomashspetsstal
 ZiO-Podolsk
 AEM-Technologies Volgodonsk

Atomenergomash also has a joint venture with Alstom (now GE Steam Power) to manufacture Arabelle steam turbines and generators. It also has subsidiaries in Hungary and the Czech Republic. In October 2010, Atomenergomash and Ukraine's nuclear power company Energoatom agreed to establish a consortium for the production of equipment for Ukrainian nuclear power plants. In November 2010, Atomenergomash announced plans to start manufacturing wind turbines and developing wind farms.

See also

 Energy policy of Russia
 Nuclear power in Russia

References

Nuclear technology companies of Russia
Industrial machine manufacturers
Wind turbine manufacturers
Mechanical engineering companies of Russia
Engineering companies of Russia
Rosatom
Energy companies established in 2006
Manufacturing companies based in Moscow
Russian brands
Russian companies established in 2005